Deoxycytidine diphosphate is a nucleoside diphosphate.  It is related to the common nucleic acid CTP, or cytidine triphosphate, with the -OH (hydroxyl) group on the 2' carbon on the nucleotide's pentose removed (hence the deoxy- part of the name), and with one fewer phosphoryl group than CTP .

2'-deoxycytidine diphosphate is abbreviated as dCDP.

Synthesis of Cytidine Nucleotides 
Deoxycytidine diphosphate is synthesized through the oxidation-reduction reaction of cytidine 5'-diphosphocholine which is catalyzed by the presence of ribonucleoside-diphosphate reductase. Additionally, ribonucleoside-diphosphate reductase is capable of binding and catalyzing both the formation of deoxyribonucleotides from ribonucleotide.

See also
 DNA
 Cofactor
 Cytosine

References

Further reading
 
 . 

Nucleotides
Pyrophosphates
Pyrimidones